Beth Karas (born January 29, 1957) is an attorney and TV commentator who worked as a Senior Reporter with truTV, providing commentary on a number of high-profile cases, including the rape trial of Kobe Bryant, the Martha Stewart trial, and the murder trials of Robert Blake, Scott Peterson, and Jodi Arias.

Early life and education
Karas grew up in Deerfield, Massachusetts and graduated from Frontier Regional School in 1975. She received a B.A. in political science and Spanish from Mount Holyoke College in 1979 and a Juris Doctor degree from Fordham Law School. She was admitted to the New York State Bar in 1987.

Career
Karas was an assistant district attorney in New York City for eight years. She joined Court TV as a commentator in 1994, having filled in as an anchor on multiple occasions. She also provided live legal commentary to BBC Radio in London from 1998 to 2011. CourtTV was subsequently renamed TruTV and eventually merged with its sister channel, HLN. A juror was dismissed from the Jodi Arias trial after she approached Karas, who covered the case first for HLN and then as a freelance journalist. She is currently an independent legal consultant. On August 16, 2019 she was a guest anchor on Court TV.

References

External links
Official Website
Karas on Crime
Court TV photo and biography

1961 births
Living people
American reporters and correspondents
Mount Holyoke College alumni
Fordham University School of Law alumni
County district attorneys in New York (state)
Place of birth missing (living people)
People from Deerfield, Massachusetts
Journalists from Massachusetts